Elections to Knowsley Metropolitan Borough Council were held on 6 May 1999. One third of the council was up for election and the Labour party kept overall control of the council.

After the election, the composition of the council was
Labour 64
Liberal Democrat 2

Election result

5 Labour councillors were uncontested.

Ward results

References

1999
1999 English local elections
1990s in Merseyside